Blake Haubeil is an American football placekicker who is a free agent. He played college football at Ohio State and was signed as an undrafted free agent by the Titans after the 2021 NFL Draft.

College career
Haubeil was ranked as a threestar recruit by 247Sports.com coming out of high school. He committed to Ohio State on July 24, 2015.

Professional career

Tennessee Titans
Haubeil was signed as an undrafted free agent by the Tennessee Titans on May 1, 2021. He was waived on August 1, 2021.

Carolina Panthers
On December 29, 2021, Haubeil was signed to the Carolina Panthers practice squad. He was released on January 4, 2022.

References

Living people
Year of birth missing (living people)